Antonio Monda (born 19 October 1962) is an Italian writer, filmmaker, essayist, and professor at New York University's Tisch School of the Arts. He is a promoter of the arts, in particular film and literature.

Family and early life

Monda was born in Velletri (Metropolitan City of Rome Capital) into a family of liberal Catholic politicians, and currently remains a practicing Catholic himself. His father, who died of a heart attack when Monda was 15, was mayor of Cisterna di Latina, a city south to Rome, and helped finance films, including some by the Taviani brothers, who employed the young Monda in 1981. His brother Andrea, currently editor of L’Osservatore Romano is also a writer, and has published several books on Tolkien, C. S. Lewis and Chesterton. His daughter, Marilù, published the fantasy saga "L'eredità dell'ombra".

Monda earned a law degree at the University of Rome La Sapienza. In 1994, he moved to New York City where, in exchange for an apartment on the Upper East Side, he worked as a superintendent, and began writing for La Repubblica as well as teaching at NYU. Susan Sontag, whom he interviewed, wrote a letter of support to help him gain tenure. From 1999 on, he also worked for various Italian government cultural institutions.

In an interview with The New York Times, Monda stated "I was the worst super in the world".

Books

Antonio Monda started as an essayist and film critic. His first book on American cinema, La Magnifica Illusione (The Magnificent Illusion), won the Efebo d'Oro as the best film book of 2003. His book Do You Believe? was translated into several languages. His debut in fiction was Assoluzione, which was originally published in Italy in 2008. With L'America non esiste, winner of Cortina D'Ampezzo Prize, he started a ten-novel project, with recurring characters, on New York in the twentieth century. The second volume was La casa sulla roccia (2014), followed by Ota Benga (2015), L'indegno (2016), L'evidenza delle cose non viste (2017), Io sono il fuoco (2018), Nel territorio del diavolo (2019) and Il principe del mondo (2021). Among his other books are the collection of short stories and photos Nella città nuda, the anthology The Hidden God (curated with Mary Lea Bandy), Lontano dai Sogni, a long interview with Ennio Morricone, and Il Paradiso dei lettori innamorati, a collection of interviews with great writers about their favourite films.

On the occasion of the American publication of Unworthy (Penguin Random House) several novelists enthusiastically praised the book: Daniel Mendelsohn, Cathleen Schine, Mary Karr, Colum McCann and Philip Roth who wrote "With storytelling finesse, Monda has written a compact and forceful book that might be a morbid erotic tale out of Boccaccio, exposing the tormented lust of the clergy."

Films

Monda has directed documentaries, commercials, and a feature film, Dicembre, presented at the Venice Film Festival, and the winner of such prizes as the Carro d'Oro, Premio Cinema Giovane, Icaro d'Oro, and Premio Navicella. In 2012 he co-produced Enzo Avitabile Music Life directed by Jonathan Demme, and also presented at the Venice Film Festival.

Criticism and journalism
He was a film critic for both the New York Review of Books and La Rivista dei Libri. After eight years with the daily newspaper Il Mattino, he became the US cultural correspondent for La Repubblica (1994 until now). At the beginning of 2019 he joined also La Stampa. After collaborating with the Italian TV channel La7 he began in 2013, the video column Central Park West on RaiNews24 and, in 2020, I film della mia vita on RaiPlay. His essays have appeared on the Paris Review and he collaborates also with Vanity Fair and Uomo Vogue.

Interviews and cultural life
Monda's interviews for La Repubblica have gained a status all of their own; he is known for asking deeply profound questions in a very direct manner, such as "Comment on Dostoyevsky's assertion that 'If God doesn't exist, everything is permitted'."

The New York Times wrote, "Mr. Monda connected with New York viscerally, though his particular affinity was for the city's Jewish-American experience. It might seem curious, since Mr. Monda is a practicing Catholic, educated by Jesuits. Today he still seems surprised by the attraction. "All of a sudden I discovered everything I like – music-wise, novel-wise – is either written, composed, or directed by a Jew", he said. He immersed himself in the writing of Singer ("my hero"), Saul Bellow, Norman Mailer and Mr. Roth, as well as in Mr. Allen's films, in Arthur Miller's plays and in George Gershwin and Bob Dylan. Next, he had an idea, to make a documentary for Italian audiences on Jewish-American authors. He interviewed as many of them as he could and in each case began with a blunt question: "Why do I like you?" This style caught the attention of director Wes Anderson, who cast Monda as himself in the film The Life Aquatic and included a parody—a DVD extra called "Mondo Monda" in which Monda asks such questions of Anderson and his associate, co-screenwriter Noah Baumbach, to befuddled reactions.

Monda often manages to use his interview connections for book topics, classroom speaker series, or social gatherings.

Amongst those he has interviewed are: Saul Bellow, Jonathan Franzen, Nathan Englander, Toni Morrison, Philip Roth, Martin Amis, Zadie Smith, Don DeLillo, EL Doctorow, Annie Proulx and Elie Wiesel appear in his books Do You Believe? and Il Paradiso dei lettori innamorati.

Festivals

A promoter of Italian-American cultural relations, he is a champion of anglophone writers in Italy and, according to The New York Times, a "one-man Italian cultural institute".
Monda is also famous for his writers' and artists' salon in his Upper West Side, Manhattan apartment, where Meryl Streep, Al Pacino, Tom Hanks, Don DeLillo, Bernardo Bertolucci, Derek Walcott, Paul Auster, Martin Scorsese, Philip Roth and Arthur Miller have mingled. The New York Times wrote: "In his Upper West Side apartment, Mr. Monda reigns as the host of the city's liveliest, some say only remaining, cultural salon". However, the word "salon" makes him wince. He prefers "laboratory of ideas." (...) "Mr. Monda's history, in all its facets, has molded him into more than a genial host and more than a champion of cultural networking. Having abandoned much of his own past, he has embraced the task of preserving Manhattan's cultural memory of itself through what he calls "my two great passions, American literature and films. (…) Mr. Monda, the Italian expatriate, has become a custodian of New York glories". Antonio Di Bella has dedicated to it the song "85th and Central Park West".

In 2006, he founded with Davide Azzolini Le Conversazioni, a global literary festival that takes place in Capri, New York, Bogotà, Palermo, Napoli and Rome. David Foster Wallace made his last public appearance there in July 2006.

In 2020, Le Conversazioni initiated an online project called Writers on Writers, in which 180 amongst the most important personalities in the world of art and culture read on video a favorite passage. Amongst the participants are: Woody Allen. Martin Scorsese, Marina Abramović, Orhan Pamuk, Marilynne Robinson, Francis Ford Coppola and Frances McDormand.

He is the founder and co-host, with Mario Sesti, of Viaggio nel Cinema Americano (A Journey into American Cinema) a series of public interviews at the Rome Auditorium with major film personalities such as Tim Burton, Spike Lee, Joel and Ethan Coen, Milos Forman, Sidney Lumet, Sean Connery, Jane Fonda, Susan Sarandon and Sydney Pollack. Terrence Malick made his first and only public appearance here in October 2007.

He has curated shows for the Guggenheim Museum, the Museum of Modern Art, Lincoln Center, the American Museum of the Moving Image, and the Academy of Motion Picture Arts and Sciences.

He is also the co-founder and the artistic director of "Open Roads: New Italian Cinema".

In February 2015 he was appointed artistic director of the Rome Film Festival. His tenure was renewed for a second mandate in 2018 and ended at the end 2021.

Awards, nominations and decorations

Winner of Premio Carro d'Oro for Dicembre (1990)
Winner of Premio Cinema Giovane for Dicembre (1990)
Winner of Premio Navicella for Dicembre (1990)
Nominated for David di Donatello as First Time Director for Dicembre (1990)
Winner of Efebo d'Oro for the best book on Cinema for La Magnifica Illusione (2003)
Winner of Premio Cortina d'Ampezzo for the novel L'America non esiste (2010)
Special Mention of Premio Giulietta for the novel L'evidenza delle cose non viste (2016)
Winner of Premio Biagio Agnes for the novel Io sono il fuoco (2018)
On June 3, 2019, the President of Italian Republic Sergio Mattarella presented him with the decoration of Ufficiale al Merito della Repubblica

List of books
La Magnifica Illusione 2003 (published by Fazi Editore updated and extended in 2007)
The Hidden God (published by MoMA) (2004)
Do you Believe? Conversations on God and Religion (2007) (published by Vintage)
Assoluzione (published by Mondadori in 2008)
Hanno preferito le tenebre. Dodici storie del male, Arnoldo Mondadori Editore, 2010 
Lontano dai sogni (published by Mondadori, in 2011)
L'america non-esiste (published by Mondadori, in 2012)
Il paradiso dei lettori innamorati (published by Mondadori, in 2013)
Nella città nuda (published by Rizzoli, in 2013)
La casa sulla roccia (published by Mondadori, in 2014)
Ota Benga (published by Mondadori, in 2015)
L'indegno (published by Mondadori, in 2016)
L'evidenza delle cose non viste (published by Mondadori, in 2017) 
Io sono il fuoco (published by Mondadori, in 2018)
Nel territorio del diavolo (published by Mondadori, in 2019)
Il principe del mondo (published by Mondadori, in 2021)

References

External links
Faculty page at NYU Tisch School of the Arts

Purchase "Do You Believe?"
Le Conversazioni

1962 births
Living people
People from Velletri
Italian film directors
Sapienza University of Rome alumni
New York University faculty
Italian emigrants to the United States